This is a list of marimba manufacturers, including both past and current marimba makers.

 Adams Musical Instruments
 Premier Percussion
 Yamaha
 Ludwig-Musser
 Majestic Percussion

Defunct companies
 J. C. Deagan, Inc.
 Leedy Manufacturing Company

See also 
List of drum makers
List of vibraphone manufacturers

.Marimba manufacturers
Lists of musical instrument manufacturing companies